Services Australia, formerly the Department of Human Services and before that the Department of Social Security, is an executive agency of the Australian Government, responsible for delivering a range of welfare, health, child support payments and other services to eligible Australian citizens and permanent residents. Services Australia delivers social services through the government programs Centrelink, Medicare, the PBS and the Child Support Agency. Eligible Australian citizens and permanent residents can access many of these services through a myGov account.

The head of the agency is the Chief Executive Officer, currently Rebecca Skinner, who is responsible to the Minister for Government Services, currently Bill Shorten.

History 
The Department of Human Services was created on 26 October 2004 as part of the Australian Government's Finance and Administration portfolio. At the time of its creation, it incorporated the Child Support Agency and CRS Australia. Later, the Human Services Legislation Amendment Act 2011 integrated Centrelink and Medicare into the structure.

The Secretary at the Department's establishment in 2004 was Patricia Scott. Helen Williams was appointed Secretary of the Department in 2007. Finn Pratt succeeded Williams in September 2009 after her retirement from the public service.

The department was renamed "Services Australia" and made an Executive Agency in machinery of government changes made by Prime Minister Scott Morrison on 29 May 2019, following the 2019 federal election.

The agency was formed by way of an administrative order announced on 26 May 2019, with the order coming into effect from 1 February 2020. As a result of this change, the previous secretary, Renée Leon was removed from her role. From 1 February 2020, the Department of Human Services began operating under the Services Australia branding with Amanda Cattermole beginning as the agency's acting Secretary until her role was discontinued.

In 2020, Services Australia signed a $460,000 contract with controversial Israeli digital intelligence company Cellebrite, to use its spyware in fraud investigations. The contract was extended in August 2021, bringing the total value to $1.2 million. Services Australia has refused to state which programs it used the technology on to investigate suspected fraud.

Responsibilities 

According to the Administrative Arrangements Order of 29 May 2019, Services Australia is responsible for administering the following services as dictated by their legislation: 
 Centrelink – Human Services (Centrelink) Act 1997
 Medicare – Human Services (Medicare) Act 1973
Child Support Agency

Services Australia also shares responsibility for the myGov platform with the Australian Taxation Office and Digital Transformation Agency.

As part of the administration of these services, Services Australia operates a number of face-to-face service centres across Australia, as well as myGov centres in major cities. In 13 locations across Tasmania, both state and federal services can be accessed through Service Tasmania centres.

See also

 List of Australian Government entities
 Minister for Government Services

References

External links

Commonwealth Government agencies of Australia
Public policy in Australia
Ministries established in 2004